Cypress Ranch High School is a secondary school located in Cypress, which is an unincorporated area in Harris County, Texas, near Houston. It is a part of the Cypress-Fairbanks Independent School District.

History 
Building and opening of the school

Trustees approved of the construction contract for Cypress Ranch High School and Warner Elementary, located on the 130 acre multi-campus site at Fry Road and Cypress North Houston, to Pepper-Lawson Construction, L.P. in the amount of $68,673,095.00. Both Cypress Ranch and Cypress Lakes High School were designed by PBK Architects, Inc. with modifications to existing plans used in the construction of Cypress Ridge High School, Cypress Woods High School, and Cypress Springs High School. Finally, Cypress Ranch opened for the 2008-2009 school year.

Viral anti-bullying video and South Park's spoof of anti-bullying video

On March 29th, 2012, Cypress Ranch High School released a lip dub video on YouTube called "Who Do U Think U R." for their anti-bullying campaign and for competing in the Great American No Bull Challenge video contest. According to the video's YouTube page, the entire project was created by Cypress Ranch students. A student at Cypress Ranch named Kaitlyn Knippers, who uploaded the video under the name "Kaitlyn K.", wrote and sang the song herself at just 15 years old. She teamed up with the student council president Triple Oswald to film the "lip-dub" of her tune. They enlisted the help of more than 1,000 students at Cypress Ranch High School and put it all together after school in less than two hours. Furthermore, the video was parodied in the 2012 South Park episode Butterballs, where the character, Stan Marsh, produces an anti-bullying video that is loosely based on Cypress Ranch's original anti-bullying video, after finding out that his friend was being bullied by his grandma.

Demographics 
The demographic breakdown of the students enrolled for 2021-22 was:

 African American: 16.9%
 Hispanic: 27.5%
 White: 32.5%
 Native American: 0.4%
 Asian: 18.7%
 Pacific Islander: 0.1%
 Two or More Races: 3.6%

Out of all of the students attending the school, 28.4% are economically disadvantaged.

Sports teams 
Baseball: won state championship in 2012 and 2015. 
Football: AAAAAA D1 Football Finalist in 2014
Further Records and Statistics

Notable alumni
 Danielle Bradbery - country singer and winner of NBC's The Voice
 Keith Ford - Former NFL running back
 Bryce Johnson - Outfielder for the San Francisco Giants
 Ty Madden - Pitcher for the Detroit Tigers
 Corbin Martin - Pitcher for the Arizona Diamondbacks
 DiDi Richards - Professional basketball player for the New York Liberty
 JJ Goss - Pitcher for the Tampa Bay Rays
 Colton Cowser - Outfielder for the Baltimore Orioles

References

External links
 

Cypress-Fairbanks Independent School District high schools
2008 establishments in Texas
Educational institutions established in 2008